doi is an Indian surname. It is a subcaste or gurjar or gujjar caste.
 are three Japanese family names that are pronounced identically, with the first kanji of each pair of characters meaning "earth." Since they are the same phonetically, they are romanized identically: "do" for the first character and "i" for the second. Their identical pronunciation makes them function as the same surname in languages with writing systems that do not use some form of Chinese characters (for example, the Latin alphabet).

People with the surname
Hiroaki Doi, hammer thrower
 Ichitarō Doi, Japanese shogi player
Isami Doi, (1903–1965), American artist
Kathryn Doi Todd, American judge and mother of Mia Doi Todd
Kiyoshi Doi (born 1933), Japanese baseball player
Koji Doi, Japanese mathematician, who introduced Doi–Naganuma lifting
Masao Doi, Japanese polymer scientist
Melissa Doi, American businesswoman and September 11 attack victim
Mia Doi Todd, American musician and daughter of Kathryn Doi Todd
Mika Doi, voice actress
Misaki Doi, Japanese professional tennis player
, Japanese electrical engineer
Naruki Doi, Japanese professional wrestler
, Japanese artistic gymnast
Ryuichi Doi, Japanese politician
, Japanese speed skater
Shoma Doi (born 1992), Japanese footballer
, Japanese footballer
Takako Doi, Japanese female politician
Takao Doi, Japanese astronaut
Takeo Doi, (1904-1996), Japanese aircraft designer
Takeo Doi, (1920–2009), Japanese psychoanalyst
Takero Doi, Japanese economist
, Japanese daimyō
Toshitada Doi, Compact Disc inventor 
Yoichi Doi, Japanese football player
Yoshihiro Doi, Japanese baseball player
Yukihiro Doi, Japanese racing cyclist
Yuriko Doi, choreographer and stage director
Remi Anri Doi, Japanese handball player

References

Japanese-language surnames